Rape and Marriage: The Rideout Case is a 1980 American made-for-television drama film directed  by Peter Levin and starring  Mickey Rourke, Linda Hamilton  and Rip Torn.

It is based on the true story of the trial of John Rideout, who was accused of raping his wife Greta in Oregon, 1978.

Plot
John Rideout (Rourke) rapes his wife (Hamilton), claiming that it is his right as a husband. She says that it is rape. The case must be settled in court.

Cast 

  Mickey Rourke as John Rideout
  Linda Hamilton as Greta Rideout 
  Rip Torn as Charles Burt
  Eugene Roche as Gary Gortmaker
  Conchata Ferrell as Helen
  Gail Strickland as Jean Christensen
  Bonnie Bartlett as Norma Joyce
  Richard Venture as Judge Richard Barber
  Alley Mills as Wanda
  Paul Koslo as Ralph Larson
  Mo Malone as Sally
  Gerald McRaney as Cliff Sulkes
  Camila Ashland as Jackie Godfrey

References

External links 

1980 television films
1980 films
1980 drama films
1980s American films
1980s English-language films
American drama television films
CBS network films
Films about rape in the United States
Films directed by Peter Levin
Films scored by Gil Mellé
Films set in 1978